Osvaldo Manuel Bazán (14 October 1934 — 30 May 1997), was an Argentine chess player, Argentine Chess Championship medalist (1959).

Biography
Osvaldo Bazán ten times won the Córdoba Province Chess Championships (1961, 1962, 1963, 1964, 1969, 1971, 1973, 1976, 1981, 1986). Osvaldo Bazán often participated in the Argentine Chess Championship finals, where he showed the best result in 1959, when he shared second place with Alberto Foguelman behind Bernardo Wexler.
Osvaldo Bazán was participant of the FIDE South America Zonal Tournament and a number of major International Chess Tournaments in South America.

Osvaldo Bazán played for Argentina in the Chess Olympiad:
 In 1960, at fourth board in the 14th Chess Olympiad in Leipzig (+5, =1, -4).

References

External links

Osvaldo Bazán chess games at 365chess.com

1934 births
1997 deaths
Sportspeople from Córdoba, Argentina
Argentine chess players
Chess Olympiad competitors
20th-century chess players